Jamil Douglas (born February 28, 1992) is an American football guard who is a free agent. He played college football at Arizona State. He has also been a member of the Miami Dolphins, New England Patriots, Atlanta Falcons, Indianapolis Colts, Tennessee Titans, Buffalo Bills, and Washington Football Team.

College career
Douglas played college football for the Arizona State Sun Devils.

Professional career

Miami Dolphins
Douglas was drafted by the Miami Dolphins in the fourth round, 114th overall, in the 2015 NFL Draft. He played in all 16 regular-season games as a rookie with six starts. On September 3, 2016, he was released by the Dolphins as part of final roster cuts and was signed to the practice squad the next day. He was promoted to the active roster on September 29, 2016, but he was released the following day and was re-signed to the practice squad. He was released on October 13, 2016.

New England Patriots
On October 18, 2016, Douglas was signed to the New England Patriots' practice squad.

On February 5, 2017, Douglas' Patriots appeared in Super Bowl LI. In the game, the Patriots defeated the Atlanta Falcons by a score of 34–28 in overtime.

On February 7, 2017, Douglas signed a futures contract with the Patriots. He was waived on September 2, 2017.

Atlanta Falcons
On September 5, 2017, Douglas was signed to the Atlanta Falcons' practice squad. He was promoted to the active roster on December 29, 2017.

On September 1, 2018, Douglas was waived by the Falcons.

Indianapolis Colts
On September 3, 2018, Douglas was signed to the Indianapolis Colts' practice squad. He was released on September 10, 2018.

Tennessee Titans
On October 3, 2018, Douglas was signed to the Tennessee Titans' practice squad. He signed a reserve/future contract with the Titans on December 31, 2018.

Douglas started the first four games of the 2019 season at right guard. He would finish the season playing in 15 games, starting five.

Buffalo Bills
Douglas signed a one-year contract with the Buffalo Bills on April 2, 2021. He was released on August 31, 2021, and re-signed to the practice squad the next day. He was promoted to the active roster on November 6. He was waived on December 11.

Washington Football Team
On December 13, 2021, Douglas was claimed off waivers by the Washington Football Team.

New York Giants
On March 18, 2022, Douglas signed with the New York Giants He was released on August 30, 2022.

References

External links
 Arizona State Sun Devils bio

1992 births
Living people
People from Cypress, California
African-American players of American football
American football offensive tackles
American football offensive guards
Arizona State Sun Devils football players
Miami Dolphins players
New England Patriots players
Atlanta Falcons players
Indianapolis Colts players
Sportspeople from Orange County, California
Players of American football from California
Tennessee Titans players
Buffalo Bills players
21st-century African-American sportspeople
Washington Football Team players
New York Giants players